Anoushey Ashraf (born 14 April 1983) is a Pakistani VJ and actress. As a VJ, she appeared on the music channel MTV Pakistan. She has also acted in a play for PTV directed by Saira Kazmi in a 13-episode serial – in which her role was that of a best friend of the lead, played by Marina Khan. She is now the face of brands such as Ponds, Warid Telecom, L'Oreal, chinyere and MTV.

Biography

Early life
Anoushey Ashraf is born into a Muslim family in Karachi, Sindh, Pakistan. Her father is a businessman and owned Cooking oil factories. She has two sisters, Natasha and Alizey. After completing her A Levels, she did her B.A., majoring in English Literature. She started her career in early 2002.

Personal life
Anoushey Ashraf is currently working as the breakfast show host on city fm 89. She enjoys reading, swimming, traveling and is very fond of animals. She is also the ambassador for the WWF (world Wildlife Fund) and is an avid rescuer of animals. Her elder sister, Natasha Qizilbash, enjoyed a brief modeling career in multiple Pakistani pop music videos such as Zalim Nazron Se and Goray Rang Ka Zamana.

Career
Anoushey Ashraf is a young dynamic style icon of Pakistan. She started off as a VJ and has done fashion modeling and has started her own clothing venture.
Anoushey Ashraf is a currently a well known VJ and actress and now a fashion model and designer in Pakistan. She gained fame as one of the initial string of VJs for Indus Music in 2002. From being a VJ, she graduated to an appearance in a PTV television serial directed by Saira Kazmi.

This young model with a smiley face and a lively personality describes herself as “Friendly, loud, hyper, impatient and a very loving person”. She loves collecting watches, and is fond of reading, traveling and swimming. Anoushey is also a brand ambassador for PONDs, 7up, Loreal Paris,  Warid Telecom and MTV Pakistan. She recently appeared in a fashion shoot for L’Oreal Paris, along with other models.

Anoushey has started a new clothing venture along with her sisters with the name Block Seven recently in Karachi. It is a western clothing brand and Anoushey Ashraf herself is the brand ambassador for her home venture. She has started off from Karachi and is planning to expand the business to Lahore and Islamabad in the future.

In September 2012, Anoushey Ashraf joined Health TV as morning show host.
In 2017 she was engaged for a brief period.

The Trendsetter
Ashraf has worked with PTV, Indus TV, and is currently working with MTV Pakistan, ARY Musik and Style 360. She can also be seen modeling Uth Oye clothing. She recently traveled to India to meet the team at MTV India.

Pakistan Idol
Anoushay is currently co-hosting the Pakistani music competition show Pakistan Idol with Mohib Mirza, she joined the show in the Piano rounds with final 24-contestants of show.

Television

Career 
As an actress, she appeared in Sehra Main Safar, Chanar Ghati and Saanp Seerhi.

References

External links
 Interview with Anoushey Ashraf
 Spotlight: Anoushey Ashraf
 https://web.archive.org/web/20070831010224/http://www.dawn.com/weekly//images/archive/030202/images3.htm

1983 births
Living people
Pakistani television actresses
VJs (media personalities)
Actresses from Lahore
21st-century Pakistani actresses